Flavobacterium agri  is a Gram-negative, strictly aerobic, rod-shaped and non-motile bacterium from the genus of Flavobacterium which has been isolated from  rhizospheric soil of the plant Coriandrum sativum.

References

aciduliphilum
Bacteria described in 2021